Proverbs 11 is the eleventh chapter of the Book of Proverbs in the Hebrew Bible or the Old Testament of the Christian Bible. The book is a compilation of several wisdom literature collections, with the heading in 1:1 may be intended to regard Solomon as the traditional author of the whole book, but the dates of the individual collections are difficult to determine, and the book probably obtained its final shape in the post-exilic period. This chapter is a part of the second collection of the book.

Text
The original text is written in Hebrew language. This chapter is divided into 31 verses.

Textual witnesses
Some early manuscripts containing the text of this chapter in Hebrew are of the Masoretic Text, which includes the Aleppo Codex (10th century), and Codex Leningradensis (1008).

There is also a translation into Koine Greek known as the Septuagint, made in the last few centuries BC. Extant ancient manuscripts of the Septuagint version include Codex Vaticanus (B; B; 4th century), Codex Sinaiticus (S; BHK: S; 4th century), and Codex Alexandrinus (A; A; 5th century).

Analysis
This chapter belongs to a section regarded as the second collection in the book of Proverbs (comprising Proverbs 10:1–22:16), also called "The First 'Solomonic' Collection" (the second one in Proverbs 25:1–29:27). The collection contains 375 sayings, each of which consists of two parallel phrases, except for Proverbs 19:7 which consists of three parts.

Verse 1
A false balance is abomination to the Lord,
but a just weight is His delight.
"Just weight": from the Hebrew term , ’e-ḇen šə-lê-māh, "a perfect stone". The word "just" or "perfect" is from the Hebrew word , shalem, which can mean "intact, whole, perfect". 

Stones were used as a standard for measuring amounts of commodities and precious metals (silver or gold) on the scales, so they were critical to the integrity of economic translations, as some people might cheat by tampering with the scale or the stones. The use of false weights and measures in business practices (cf. Proverbs 16:11; 20:10, 23) is condemned in the Torah (Deuteronomy 25:13–16; Leviticus 19:35–36) and the books of prophets (Amos 8:5; Micah 6:11) as well as in ancient Near-Eastern law codes (ANET 388, 423); the term 'abomination to the LORD' conveys the strongest possible condemnation (cf. Proverbs 6:16).

Verse 16
A gracious woman gets honor,
and violent men get riches.
"Violent men": from the Hebrew root , ʿarits, referring “a person who strikes terror into the hearts of his victims" or " a ruthless person who uses violence to overcome his victims" (BDB 792 s.v.).

The Greek Septuagint version has an addition between the first and second clause as follows:
She who hates virtue makes a throne for dishonor;
the idle will be destitute of means
This is followed by several English versions (e.g., NAB, NEB, NRSV, TEV). 
The saying contrasts 'the honor that a
woman obtains through her natural disposition' with 'the effort men must expend to acquire wealth', with an implication that 'the ruthless men will obtain wealth without honor'.

See also

Related Bible parts: Psalm 30, Psalm 49, Proverbs 9, Proverbs 20, Proverbs 23

References

Sources

External links
 Jewish translations:
 Mishlei - Proverbs - Chapter 11 (Judaica Press) translation [with Rashi's commentary] at Chabad.org
 Christian translations:
 Online Bible at GospelHall.org (ESV, KJV, Darby, American Standard Version, Bible in Basic English)
 Book of Proverbs Chapter 11 King James Version
  Various versions

11